"Give Me Back My Hometown" is a song co-written and recorded by American country music singer Eric Church. It was released in January 2014 as the second single from his 2014 album The Outsiders. The song reached number one on the US Billboard Country Airplay chart in May 2014. It also peaked at number 4 on Hot Country Songs. Church wrote this song with Luke Laird.

Critical reception
Matt Bjorke of Roughstock gave the single 4 out of 5 stars, saying that "Jay Joyce's production once again finds musically interesting things to do while Church earnestly sings about the loss of his hometown, not because it’s actually gone or changed but because the girl who helped it make it worthwhile has left him and the town back" and "for the middle of the road fan who likes the softer moments of Eric Church’s music…this one should easily be much more pleasing to them than "The Outsiders" was."

Commercial performance
Eric Church had his best debut on the chart when the song entered at No. 95 on the Billboard Hot 100 and No. 39 on the Hot Country Songs during its first week, with 28,000 copies sold. The following week, the song climbed to No. 55 on the Billboard Hot 100 and No. 25 on Hot Country Songs. The song also topped the Country Digital Song chart with over 61,000 copies sold. The song then jumped to No. 36 on the Billboard Hot 100 on its 14th week of release, and No. 4 on the Hot Country Songs chart on its 15th. As of June 2014, "Give Me Back My Hometown" has sold 758,000 copies in the United States.

The song also debuted at No. 61 on the Canadian Hot 100 during its first week and climbed to No. 30 the week after.

Music video
Peter Zavadil directed the accompanying music video for this song. According to The Boot, the video "features Church singing as an ominous story plays out, including a priest (Steven Michael Quezada) presiding over a roadside funeral in a rundown part of town."

In response to viewers' confusion over the meaning of the video's story, Church said that "[he] don't understand it either." It was later stated that the story would continue with the video for each single from the album.

Chart performance

Weekly charts

Year-end charts

Certifications

References

2014 songs
2014 singles
Country ballads
2010s ballads
Eric Church songs
EMI Records singles
Songs written by Eric Church
Songs written by Luke Laird
Song recordings produced by Jay Joyce
Music videos directed by Peter Zavadil